× Sorbaronia mitschurinii, also known as Sorbaronia mitschurinii, is a domesticated species that was known until recently under the name Aronia mitschurinii. It has been considered to be a group of cultivars of Aronia melanocarpa, common ones including 'Viking' and 'Nero'. Genetic testing indicates it is likely a 
hybrid between A. melanocarpa and Sorbus aucuparia (mountain ash) that apparently originated in cultivation.

Hypothesized origin
Sorbaronia mitschurinii has been suggested to be the product of Russian pomologist Ivan Vladimirovich Michurin's early 20th-century experiments in wide hybridizations.

Description
This species is more robust than wild populations of Aronia melanocarpa; the leaves are broader, and the fruits larger. It is tetraploid and self-fertile.

Uses
Sorbaronia mitschurinii has historically seen extensive cultivation in the former Soviet Union as its large fruits are suitable for juice, wine, and jam-making, and because they are self-fertile, requiring only one plant to produce fruit.

Like other Aronia, the fruit is used as a flavoring or colorant for beverages or yogurts. Juice from the ripe berries is astringent, sweet (with high sugar content), sour (low pH), and contains vitamin C. In addition to juice, the fruit can be baked into soft breads. In the U.S., Aronia berries are also marketed for their antioxidant properties.

References

Maleae
Hybrid plants